Daphne giraldii is a shrub, of the family Thymelaeaceae.  It is deciduous, and is found in regions of China.

Description
The shrub grows to a height of 0.45 to 0.8 m.  Its flowers are golden yellow, and grow in groups of 3 to 8.  Its flowers are long, thin, and dark green. It is found on open slopes and forest edges, at altitudes from 1600 to 3100 m.

References

giraldii